Cuisine (With Piscatorial) is the ninth studio album released by Australian electronic music group Severed Heads, issued in 1991. The album's lead single, "Twister", was released a year later.

Background
The compact disc edition of the album includes five extra tracks that the cassette edition lacked. Grouped as Piscatorial on the CD packaging, these five songs were recorded between 1988 and 1989 at a studio called dB Productions. The rest of the album (Cuisine, the first 13 tracks) was recorded between 1989 and 1991 at Terse Tapes in Sydney, Australia, except "Twister", which was recorded live in Riverdale, California.

Track listing

 1, 5, 6 and 15 were originally released in 1993 by Ellard's side band Co Kla Coma (with Lucy CyberVuva and Karen Eliot), appearing under the pseudonym Fußßßball, as part of a German split CD with the band Juniper Hill entitled Können Tiere Denken/Jedermann Sein Eigner Fußball.
 13, 20 and 21 are exclusive to this reissue.
 "Seven of Oceans," "Finder," and the final version of "Estrogen" have been removed.

Personnel
Tom Ellard – vocals, synthesizers, production, artwork
Stephen Jones – video synthesizers, production
Robert Racic – editing
Woolford Higgins – design, artwork
Jason G – artwork
Andrew Dunstall – artwork

Release history

References

External links
 
 Bandcamp page

Severed Heads albums
1991 albums